El Jones is a poet, journalist, professor and activist living in Halifax, Nova Scotia. She was Halifax's Poet Laureate from 2013 to 2015.

Biography
She was born in Wales and grew up in Winnipeg.  Her book, Live From the Afrikan Resistance! published in 2014 by Roseway, an imprint of Fernwood Publishing, is a collection of poems about resisting white colonialism. In 2015, she was a resident at the International Writing Program at University of Iowa. Her work focuses on social justice issues such as feminism, prison abolition, anti-racism, and decolonization; she wrote in The Washington Postin June 2020 about "the realities of white-supremacist oppression that black people in Canada have long experienced."

Since 2016, she has co-hosted a radio show called Black Power Hour on CKDU-FM, an educational program which provides information on Black history and culture aimed at incarcerated people. Listeners from prisons call in to rap and read poetry that they have written, providing a voice to people who rarely get a wide audience. She is a contributor to the Halifax Examiner and the Huffington Post Canada. She has taught at Dalhousie University, Acadia University, Nova Scotia Community College, Saint Mary's University and Mount Saint Vincent University. In 2017, she was named the 15th Nancy's Chair in Women's Studies at Mount Saint Vincent University.

In 2021, Jones became a contributor to The Breach, an alternative, Canadian news website.

In March 2022 she was amongst 151 international feminists signing Feminist Resistance Against War: A Manifesto, in solidarity with the Feminist Anti-War Resistance initiated by Russian feminists after the Russian invasion of Ukraine.

Awards and honours 
 Named a Bold Visionary in 2014 by the A Bold Vision National Leadership Conference. 
 Recipient of the Dr. Allan Burnley (Rocky) Jones Individual Award at the Nova Scotia Human Rights Award (2016) for her "commitment to advancing human rights, equity and inclusion."
 Two-time National Spoken Word Champion.
 2017/18  Poet in Residence for Poetry in Voice.

References 

Living people
Canadian activists
Black Canadian women
Canadian women poets
21st-century Canadian poets
Black Canadian writers
Canadian women activists
21st-century Canadian women writers
Year of birth missing (living people)
Poets Laureate of Halifax, Nova Scotia